Rola Al-Tabash Jaroudi is a Lebanese politician from the Future Movement who was elected to the Parliament of Lebanon in 2018. She didn't stand for re-election in the 2022 general election.

See also 

 Candidates of the 2018 Lebanese general election

References 

Living people
Future Movement politicians
21st-century Lebanese women politicians
21st-century Lebanese politicians
Members of the Parliament of Lebanon
Year of birth missing (living people)